Sheremsah is a village on the Nile in the governorate of Damietta. Its name goes back to the ancient Egyptian language. It was used as a camp during the Seventh Crusade. Its name was mentioned in several books such as:
 Wa Islamah, a historical novel by Ali Ahmad Bakathir.
 Al-Khotat, a book about history and geography of Egypt by Al-maqurizi.
 The Personality of Egypt, A book about the geography of Egypt, by Dr. Gamal Hemdan.

Famous personalities
 Ibrahim "bey" El-Zohairy, Member of the first Egyptian parliament in 1923.
 Hamza "bey" El-Zohairy.
 Abbas El-Zohairy.
 Ahmed El-Zohairy.
 Adel El-Zohairy.
 Basem El-Zohairy.
 Haytham El-Zohairy.
 Amr El-Zohairy

Populated places in Damietta Governorate
Villages in Egypt